L'Intermédiaire des chercheurs et curieux (French: The Intermediate of the Researchers and Curious), abbreviated as ICC, is a monthly French magazine consisting of questions and answers of its readers on various encyclopedic topics. It focuses mainly on art, history, genealogy, literature, and religions.

History
The magazine appeared from 1864 to 1940. Initially it focused on the arts and all sciences. It reappeared in April 1951, first under a slightly different name.

A high-ranking official of Scottish origin, Charles Read, under the pseudonym of Carle de Rash, was the founder and the first director. He took as a model the Notes and Queries, published in London, and based it on the same principle. Genealogical and nobility issues gained in importance following the reappearance in 1951.

Since 1981 ICC is not published in September, i.e. the number of issues reduced from 12 to 11 per year.

Editors
 Octave Lebesgue (1900–1931)                                               
 Philippe du Puy de Clinchamps (1913–1971), founder of the new series in 1951
 Lucien Boisnormand 
 Patrice du Puy de Clinchamps, son of Philippe
 Philippe Houël de Chaulieu
 Charles-Henri de Sommyèvre

Other contributors
 Paul Masson, between 1879 and 1895
 Gustave Bord

Price
The ICC is sold by annual subscription:
 1985: 400 French francs
 1990: 485 French francs
 1995: 608 French francs
 2000: 635 French francs
 2012: 99 Euro

References

External links
 L'Intermédiaire des chercheurs et curieux, 1864-1937, Bibliothèque nationale de France (BnF), Gallica

1864 establishments in France
French-language magazines
History magazines
Genealogy publications
Monthly magazines published in France
Magazines published in Paris